Joe Zuppanic is a paralympic athlete from Canada competing mainly in category C3-4 sprint events.

Joe competed in Barcelona at the 1992 Summer Paralympics.  He competed in the 100m, 200m, 400m 800m winning the bronze medal in the 100m.

References

Paralympic track and field athletes of Canada
Athletes (track and field) at the 1992 Summer Paralympics
Paralympic bronze medalists for Canada
Living people
Medalists at the 1992 Summer Paralympics
Year of birth missing (living people)
Paralympic medalists in athletics (track and field)
Canadian male sprinters